Brian N. Connor (May 23, 1946November 8, 2014) was an American pastor and exorcist who also taught people about spiritual warfare.

Background
Connor was born May 23, 1946 in Charleston, South Carolina to his parents George Connor and Mary Connor.

Connor graduated from the Southern Baptist Theological Seminary in Louisville, Kentucky and held a doctor of ministry degree.

Ministry
In 1985 the ministry of exorcism was first introduced to him when he encountered a woman who was a third generation satanist. From then on he ministered to people with spiritual oppression. He said of exorcisms that, "when one experiences it face-to-face – when one sees evil, smells it, feels it, has things thrown in his face, encounters evil prowling around like a lion – then you know there's a spiritual warfare going on all around us."<ref>[http://www.bpnews.net/BPnews.asp?ID=2581 Baptist Press, 27-year veteran leaving pastorate to launch 'ministry of deliverance''', Todd Deaton, October 14, 1998]</ref>

In 1998, after twenty-seven years as a pastor at Southern Baptist churches in Maryland and South Carolina he left his ministry to become a full-time exorcist and run his deliverance ministry. Connor believed that spiritual oppression is a real part of biblical metaphysics, which includes angels, demons and Satan.

Connor stated that even people who go to church regularly or minister can still be oppressed. "By belonging to Jesus Christ, we are forgiven in terms of salvation," he explained.<ref name="ReferenceA">Baptist Press, 27-year veteran leaving pastorate to launch 'ministry of deliverance', Todd Deaton, October 14, 1998</ref> "We can still make wrong choices which open doors within us to satanic oppression by dabbling in the occult, attempting to communicate with the dead, using crystals, accepting New Age beliefs, following spirit guides, participating in rituals." "Anytime someone reaches out to an evil spirit, that spirit puts down roots and will torment and oppress that person," Connor stated.

On November 13, 2001, he appeared on Dateline NBC casting demons out of an American baptist. He founded and led the Good Shepherd Institute which helped spiritually oppressed people. He was featured in Esquire (August 2002) and FHM'' (August 2003) and seen on The History Channel, A&E Channel, Biography Channel and The Learning Channel.

Death

Connor died on Saturday, November 8, 2014. Aside from his mother, Mary Connor, He is survived by his wife June Christopher Connor of Folly Beach; 2 daughters, Amy Connor Bradley and husband Dr. Raymond J. Bradley of New Bern, NC, Carey Connor McNamara and husband Dr. Robert McNamara of Mt. Pleasant; the girls' mother, Faye Vickery Connor of Mt Pleasant, a step-son, Jonathan "Jay" Argoe Jr. of Folly Beach; brother James "Jim" Connor and wife Janet of Floyd, VA; grandchildren, Caroline, Samuel, and Benjamin Bradley, and Connor McNamara.

Further reading
 The Post & Courier, "Skeptic ponders spiritual things in Heaven and Earth," by Michael Gartland, August 28, 2005
 Dateline NBC, April 27, 2005
 FHM Magazine, August 2003
 "Deliver Us From Evil," The Learning Channel, February 11, 2003 
 Esquire Presents, 'What It Feels Like'. New York, Three Rivers Press, 2003
 Esquire Magazine, August 2002
 Dateline NBC, November 13, 2001 
 The Observer, "Americans plagued by new demons," October 8, 2000 
 "Exorcising the Devil", October 25, 1999
 Baptist Press, 27-year veteran leaving pastorate to launch 'ministry of deliverance', October 14, 1998

References

External links
 Good Shepherd Institute
 Good Shepherd Institute Blog

1946 births
2014 deaths
Clergy from Charleston, South Carolina
Spiritual warfare
Southern Baptist Theological Seminary alumni
20th-century Baptist ministers from the United States
21st-century Baptist ministers  from the United States
American exorcists